Meganaclia is a genus of moths in the family Erebidae.

Species
 Meganaclia sippia Plötz, 1880

Former species
 Meganaclia carnea Hampson, 1898
 Meganaclia microsippia Strand, 1912
 Meganaclia perpusilla Walker, 1856

References

Natural History Museum Lepidoptera generic names catalog

Syntomini
Moth genera